Stathmopoda cephalaea is a moth of the family Stathmopodidae. It was described by Edward Meyrick in 1897. It is found in Australia and has been recorded in New Zealand.

References

Moths described in 1897
Stathmopodidae
Moths of Australia
Taxa named by Edward Meyrick
Moths of New Zealand